Lasana is a census-designated place (CDP) in Cameron County, Texas, United States. The population was 84 at the 2010 census, down from 135 at the 2000 census. It is part of the Brownsville–Harlingen Metropolitan Statistical Area.

Geography
Lasana is located in northwestern Cameron County at  (26.255651, -97.694523).

Demographics
As of the census of 2000, there were 135 people, 42 households, and 30 families residing in the CDP. The population density was 149.7 people per square mile (57.9/km2). There were 50 housing units at an average density of 55.5/sq mi (21.5/km2). The racial makeup of the CDP was 66.67% White, 1.48% Native American, 30.37% from other races, and 1.48% from two or more races. Hispanic or Latino of any race were 94.81% of the population.

There were 42 households, out of which 33.3% had children under the age of 18 living with them, 69.0% were married couples living together, 4.8% had a female householder with no husband present, and 26.2% were non-families. 16.7% of all households were made up of individuals, and 4.8% had someone living alone who was 65 years of age or older. The average household size was 3.21 and the average family size was 3.84.

In the CDP, the population was spread out, with 26.7% under the age of 18, 12.6% from 18 to 24, 32.6% from 25 to 44, 17.8% from 45 to 64, and 10.4% who were 65 years of age or older. The median age was 30 years. For every 100 females, there were 80.0 males. For every 100 females age 18 and over, there were 86.8 males.

The median income for a household in the CDP was $16,667, and the median income for a family was $43,750. Males had a median income of $35,625 versus $28,125 for females. The per capita income for the CDP was $8,820. There were 44.4% of families and 36.0% of the population living below the poverty line, including 53.8% of under eighteens and 100.0% of those over 64.

Education
Lasana is served by the Harlingen Consolidated Independent School District.

In addition, South Texas Independent School District operates magnet schools that serve the community.

References

Census-designated places in Cameron County, Texas
Census-designated places in Texas